Stacey Tremayne Hawkins is a  United States Air Force lieutenant general who serves as the commander of the Air Force Sustainment Center. He previously served as director of logistics, engineering, and force protection of the Air Combat Command.

Military career 

In May 2022, Hawkins was nominated for promotion to lieutenant general and assignment as commander of the Air Force Sustainment Center.

References

External links

Living people
Year of birth missing (living people)
Place of birth missing (living people)
United States Air Force generals
Recipients of the Defense Superior Service Medal
Recipients of the Legion of Merit
Recipients of the Meritorious Service Medal (United States)